That Face! is the final album by Frank Sinatra, Jr. and featuring Steve Tyrell.

The album was released on CD and features the younger Sinatra performing Great American Songbook tunes along with one self-written number, with arrangements by his father's longtime collaborators Nelson Riddle and Don Costa. Sinatra later expressed unhappiness with his vocals, stating they were recorded while he was undergoing treatment for prostate cancer.

Track listing
"That Face" (Alan Bergman, Lew Spence)  – 2:23
"I'm Afraid the Masquerade Is Over" (Herbert Magidson, Allie Wrubel)  – 3:44
"Feeling Good" (Leslie Bricusse)  – 3:08
"I Was a Fool (To Let You Go)" (Barry Manilow, Marty Panzer)  – 3:22
"Spice" (Frank Sinatra, Jr.)  – 3:28
"Girl Talk" (Bobby Troup) (featuring Steve Tyrell)  – 4:53
"Cry Me a River" (Arthur Hamilton)  – 5:45
"What a Diff'rence a Day Made" (María Grever, Stanley Adams)  – 3:05
"You'll Never Know" (Harry Warren, Mack Gordon)  – 2:58
"Softly, as in a Morning Sunrise" (Oscar Hammerstein II, Sigmund Romberg)  – 3:38
"Trouble With Hello Is Goodbye" (Alan Bergman, Dave Grusin)  – 3:40
"Walking Happy" (Sammy Cahn, Jimmy Van Heusen)  – 2:42
"The People That You Never Get to Love" (Rupert Holmes)  – 4:28
"And I Love You So" (Don McLean)  - 4:06 (Bonus track (special QVC CD))

Personnel
 Frank Sinatra, Jr. - Vocals
 Steve Tyrell - Vocals
 Nelson Riddle - Arranger
 Don Costa - Arranger

References

2006 albums
Albums arranged by Nelson Riddle
Albums arranged by Don Costa
Rhino Records albums